Charl Mattheus (born March 9, 1965 in Somerset East, Eastern Cape, South Africa ) is a South African Ultra Marathon Athlete.

Life and education
He grew up in Despatch, Eastern Cape and completed his high school diploma at High School Despatch in 1982. He subsequently attended and completed a National Technical Diploma in Mechanical Engineering at Russell Road Technical College in Port Elizabeth in 1989. His United States education include a Bachelor of Science in Management (2007), Masters in Business Administration, MBA in Healthcare Management (2011) from Indiana Wesleyan University and Doctor of Business Administration, DBA in Healthcare Management (2017) at Walden University. Doctoral Dissertation Study Title: Managerial Intervention Strategies to Reduce Patient No-Show Rates.
Dr. Mattheus published his first book in 2020: Understanding the United States Health Care System 

He was South Africa 100 km Champion in 1991.  He represented South Africa at the IAU 100 km World Championships in 1993, 1994 & 1995. He is popular for his Comrades Marathon win in 1992.  He was disqualified for taking over the counter cold medication, containing, phenylpropanolamine. It was a prohibited stimulant, but was removed from the banned list shortly after the disqualification. Phenylpropanolamine is not one of the prohibited stimulants the World Anti-Doping Agency listed on their 2016 list.
Mattheus finished the Comrades Marathon twelve times, 1987- 21st, 1988 – 7th, 1989 – 9th, 1990 – 32nd, 1991 – 6th, 1992 – 1st (but disqualified), 1994 – 11th, 1995 – 2nd, 1996 – 4th, 1997 – 1st (Comrades Marathon Champion), 1998 – 2nd, & 2000 – 154th.  Mattheus is the only athlete to lose his Comrades Marathon Champion title and regain the title a few years later, improving on his 5:42:34, 1992  time with a 5:28:37 time.  Dr. Charl Mattheus is now a dual United States and South African Citizen and living in Waimānalo, Hawaii, United States.

References

South African male marathon runners
1965 births
Living people
South African ultramarathon runners
People from Somerset East
Sportspeople from the Eastern Cape